The Vienna Environmental Research Accelerator, VERA, is a particle accelerator. It is operated by the University of Vienna and is dedicated to Accelerator Mass Spectrometry (AMS). It started operation in 1995.

The system is a 3-MV Pelletron type tandem accelerator, designed to accelerate protons or heavy ions.

See also
Accelerator mass spectrometry
List of accelerator mass spectrometry facilities

External links
The VERA accelerator home page.
The Fakultät für Physik (Faculty of Physics) at the ... 
Universität Wien (University of Vienna).

References

Particle accelerators
University of Vienna